William Dailey may refer to:

William Dailey of the Fitz Hugh Ludlow Memorial Library
Will Dailey
Bill Dailey
Rev. William R. "Bill" Dailey, C.S.C., former Pastoral Resident in Christie Hall at the University of Portland

See also
William Daily (disambiguation)
William Daly (disambiguation)
William Daley (disambiguation)